Karin Kalisa (born 1965) is a German writer. 

She lived in Japan and Austria before settling in Berlin. She is a linguist and philosopher. Her first novel The Familiar Melody of Sung's Shop was translated into French. Other works include Sternstunde, Radio Activity and Bergsalz.

References

1965 births
Living people
German writers
German women writers